Jon Glaser Loves Gear is an American mockumentary television series with reality segments that premiered October 25, 2016  on truTV. Hosted by Jon Glaser playing a fictionalized version of himself, the show focuses on the comedian's love of gear and gadgets.

On May 12, 2017, it was announced that Jon Glaser Loves Gear had been renewed for a second season, which was originally expected to premiere in 2018. The second season aired between January 9 and March 11, 2019.

The series was not picked up for a third season.

Cast and characters
 Jon Glaser as himself
 John Hodgman as the voice of Gear-i
 Steve Cirbus as himself, Jon's 'Spurt (short for gear expert) 
 Eva Solveig as herself, also plays Jon's Fake Wife
 Miriam Tolan as Leslie, Jon's Real Wife
 Nadia Dajani as Dr. Ellen Trammell, Jon's therapist
 Eli Tokash as Jon's Son
 Charlie Jones as Jon's Fake Son
 Hope Lauren Richardson as Jon's Fake Daughter
 Wyatt Cirbus as himself, Steve's Son
 Bhavesh Patel as Daniel, a TruTV executive who is in charge of the show
 Greta Lee as the voice of Drone-i Malonie, Steve's drone and Gear-i's love interest (season 2)
 Bowen Yang as Bowen, Jon's son's psychologist and, briefly, Steve's replacement as a 'Spurt (season 2)

Episodes

Series overview

Season 1 (2016)

Season 2 (2019)

References

External links
Official site

2016 American television series debuts
2019 American television series endings
2010s American mockumentary television series
2010s American reality television series
Television series by PFFR
TruTV original programming
English-language television shows